Donovan is a Scottish singer, songwriter, and guitarist.

Donovan may also refer to:

People 
Donovan (name), a given name and surname

Places 
 Castle Donovan, a ruined castle 12 kilometers east of Bantry, County Cork, Ireland
 General Donovan Department, Argentina
 Donovan, Georgia, United States
 Donovan, Illinois, United States
 Donovan Lake, a lake in Minnesota, United States
 Donovans, South Australia, Australia
 Donovans, Newfoundland and Labrador, Canada

Ships 
 HMS Donovan, a minesweeper launched 1918, sold 1921
 Empire Battleaxe, an Infantry Landing Ship that operated as HMS Donovan from 1944 to 1946

Music 
 HMS Donovan (album), a 1971 album by Donovan
 Donovan P. Leitch (album), a Donovan compilation
 "Donovan", a song by Happy Mondays from their 1990 album Pills 'n' Thrills and Bellyaches
 Donovan (album)

Fictional characters 
 Clyde Donovan, a character in the television series South Park
 Curtis Donovan, a character from Misfits
 Donovan (American Horror Story), an American Horror Story: Hotel character
 Donovan Baine, a character from the Vampire/Darkstalkers series of games by Capcom
 Walter Donovan the main antagonist of Indiana Jones and the Last Crusade
 W.H. Donovan, a character in the novel Donovan's Brain by Curt Siodmak
 Sleazy character in The Lenny Henry Show, played by Lenny Henry

Other uses 
 Donovan (horse), winner of the 1889 Epsom Derby
 Donovan Data Systems, a software and computer services company

See also 
Donavan (disambiguation)
Donavon (disambiguation)
O'Donovan (disambiguation)
O'Donovan (surname)